Theodor Schmidt (1897–?) was an Estonian politician. He was a member of IV Riigikogu.

References

1897 births
Members of the Riigikogu, 1929–1932
Year of death missing